Rodolfo Lavín Martínez (born July 30, 1977) is a Mexican racing driver from San Luis Potosí. He most notably raced in the Champ Car World Series.

In Mexico, Lavín raced in Formula Azteca and Formula 3. With funding in the form of sponsorship from Corona, with whom his father is on the board, Lavin raced in Indy Lights from 1996 to 2000 and Toyota Atlantics from 2001 to 2002. Lavín was not particularly successful in either series with no wins, but a best finish of 6th in Indy Lights and 2nd in Toyota Atlantics. However, he did manage to start a record 58 races in Indy Lights.

Regardless, he moved up to the Champ Car series in 2003, driving a disadvantaged Reynard chassis for Walker Racing. He had a mediocre rookie season, but managed to sign with Forsythe Championship Racing, a top Champ Car team, for the 2004 season. In 2004, Lavín notched one front row start and one podium; however, he was not a consistent front-runner, and was usually behind teammates Paul Tracy and Patrick Carpentier.  Lavín found himself out of a ride at the start of the 2005 season, but he joined the HVM team halfway through the season with respectable results.

He tried to get sponsorship from Corona for the 2007 Champ Car season but no deal was made.

He is currently living in San Luis Potosí and he is one of the owners of the Santa Ursula Camp.

Motorsports results

Complete American open–wheel racing results
(key)

Indy Lights

Atlantic Championship

CART/Champ Car World Series

 ^ New points system introduced in 2004.

External links
  Rodolfo Lavín's biography

1977 births
Champ Car drivers
Mexican racing drivers
Mexican Formula Three Championship drivers
Atlantic Championship drivers
Sportspeople from San Luis Potosí
Indy Lights drivers
Living people
Walker Racing drivers
Meyer Shank Racing drivers
Forsythe Racing drivers
HVM Racing drivers